Pryg-skok: detskie pesenki (Hop-Frog: Songs For Kids) is the first studio album by the Soviet psychedelic rock band Egor i Opizdenevshie, released in 1992 on Zolotaja Dolina.

History 
In the summer of 1990, after Grazhdanskaya Oborona broke up, Egor Letov went hiking in the forests and rocks of the Urals, which he states inspired the album's title. While hiking, he was bitten by a tick and contracted encephalitis. Upon his return to Omsk, he had a high fever, and was forced to stay in bed for a month. His doctor had told him that he had a high chance of either becoming paralyzed or going insane, neither of which happened. To pass the time, Letov started watching football matches on TV and became a fan of the Cameroon national football team, who he dedicated the album to, alongside his longtime friend Eugene Lischenko, who had died around that time.

The song "Pro durachka" was intended to have a full electric guitar, bass and drum backing, but it was not possible, so Egor recorded the song using a 4-track. It was an a cappella version of the song with four vocal parts (initially 18). The song would later be revisited on Grazhdanskaya Oborona's comeback album Lunnyi perevorot in 1997, as Letov intended.

The album was initially distributed to Grazhdanskaya Oborona fans and Letov's friends on reel-to-reel and traded cassettes. It was given its first proper release in 1992 on Zolotaja Dolina, who released it on vinyl and licensed it to BSA Records for release on CD. It was re-released in 1999 on CD and cassette as part of Grazhdanskaya Oborona's record deal with Moroz Records, and again in 2005 on Misteriya Zvuka. It was reissued again in 2014 on Wyrgorod. Mirumir reissued the album on vinyl in 2014, the first vinyl release of the album in 22 years.

In 2005, Pryg-skok was remastered and reissued in 2007 with outtakes from the Sto let odinochestva sessions as bonus tracks. The original vinyl and CD issues on Zolotaja Dolina and BSA included a cover of "Krasnyi smekh" by Instruktsiya po Vyzhivaniyu, but it was left off the 2007 remaster and was finally included on the 2013 vinyl reissue of Grazhdanskaya Oborona's 1990 album Instruktsiya po vyzhivaniyu. The album was reissued on vinyl in 2014, based on the track listing of the 2005 reissue.

Track list

GrOb Records reel-to-reel "release" (1990)

Zolotaja Dolina LP (1992) and BSA/Stalker-2 CD (1993)

BSA CD (1994) and XOP/Moroz CD and cassette (1999)

Misteriya Zvuka CD (2005), Mirumir LP (2014) and Wyrgorod CD (2014)

External links 
 Pryg-skok at Discogs

1992 albums